6460 Bassano, provisional designation , is a stony Flora asteroid from the inner regions of the asteroid belt, approximately 4.5 kilometers in diameter. The asteroid was discovered on 26 October 1992, by Italian amateur astronomers Ulisse Quadri and Luca Strabla at the Bassano Bresciano Observatory in northern Italy. It was named for the Italian village of Bassano Bresciano.

Orbit and classification 

The S-type asteroid is a member of the Flora family, one of the largest groups of stony asteroids in the main-belt. Bassano orbits the Sun in the inner main-belt at a distance of 2.0–2.5 AU once every 3 years and 5 months (1,239 days). Its orbit has an eccentricity of 0.11 and an inclination of 3° with respect to the ecliptic.

Physical characteristics

Rotation period 

Two rotational lightcurves of Bassano were obtained from photometric observations at the Palomar Transient Factory in August 2012.

Diameter and albedo 

According to the survey carried out by the NEOWISE mission of NASA's space-based Wide-field Infrared Survey Explorer, Bassano measures 4.3 kilometers in diameter and its surface has a high albedo of 0.39. The Collaborative Asteroid Lightcurve Link assumes a lower albedo of 0.24 – derived from 8 Flora, the principal body and namesake of its orbital family – and hence calculates a larger diameter of 4.9 kilometers.

Naming 

This minor planet was named for the location of the discovering observatory, Bassano Bresciano, an ancient village in northern Italy.

The historic village was under Longobard and Frank control during the early Middle Ages, and then ruled by the House of Sforza and the Venice republic. In the 16th century the former marshland was regained by the two Italian agronomists Camillo Tarello and Agostino Gallo. Monuments in the village include Luzzago's palace and Brunelli's villa. Its church has a Via Crucis credited to the school of Venetian painter Giovanni Tiepolo, one of the great Old Masters of that period. The official naming citation was published by the Minor Planet Center on 9 September 1995.

References

External links 
 Bassano Bresciano Astronomical Observatory – homepage
 Asteroid Lightcurve Database (LCDB), query form (info )
 Dictionary of Minor Planet Names, Google books
 Asteroids and comets rotation curves, CdR – Observatoire de Genève, Raoul Behrend
 Discovery Circumstances: Numbered Minor Planets (5001)-(10000) – Minor Planet Center
 
 

006460
Named minor planets
19921026